Central Tongu is one of the constituencies represented in the Parliament of Ghana. It elects one Member of Parliament (MP) by the first past the post system of election. Central Tongu is located in the North Tongu district  of the Volta Region of Ghana.

It is made up of three Traditional areas; Bakpa, Mafi and Kpoviedzi. its capital is Mafi Adidome

Senior High Schools

Boundaries
The seat is located within the North Tongu District of the Volta Region of Ghana. Before the 2004 December presidential and parliamentary elections, old North Tongu constituency was divided into the current North Tongu and the Central Tongu constituencies.

Members of Parliament

Elections

See also
List of Ghana Parliament constituencies

References 

Adam Carr's Election Archives
Ghana Home Page

Parliamentary constituencies in the Volta Region